2004–05 Pirveli Liga was the 16th season of the Georgian Pirveli Liga.

League standings

See also
2004–05 Umaglesi Liga
2004–05 Georgian Cup

External links
Georgia 2004/05 RSSSF

Erovnuli Liga 2 seasons
2004–05 in Georgian football
Georgia